Darwinneon is a monotypic genus of  jumping spiders containing the single species, Darwinneon crypticus. It was first described by B. Cutler in 1971, and is only found on the Galápagos Islands. The name is a combination of the Neon and Charles Darwin. Crypticus means "hidden" in Latin.

References

Endemic fauna of the Gal%C3%A1pagos Islands
Monotypic Salticidae genera
Salticidae
Spiders of South America